Republic Road 11 (Bulgarian: Републикански път I-11) is a 2nd class Bulgarian road spanning half of the Danube border with Romania.

Description

The road starts south of Vidin, near Dunavtsi and continues across villages across the Danube. The first town on the route is Lom, the road then continues through the Bulgarian countryside passing by Kozloduy, then it continues across minor towns and villages until it ends near the village of Cherkovitsa.

References

Roads in Bulgaria